Providence is an unincorporated community in Rockingham County, North Carolina, United States.

References

Unincorporated communities in Rockingham County, North Carolina
Unincorporated communities in North Carolina